Molybdopygus is an extinct genus of estemmenosuchid dinocephalians from the Middle Permian of Russia. It is known from a single pelvis.

See also

 List of therapsids

References

 The main groups of non-mammalian synapsids at Mikko's Phylogeny Archive

Tapinocephalians
Prehistoric therapsid genera
Extinct animals of Russia
Fossil taxa described in 1964